The Wilfrid Laurier Golden Hawks, commonly shortened to Laurier Golden Hawks, is the name used by the varsity sports teams of Wilfrid Laurier University in Waterloo, Ontario, Canada. The university's varsity teams compete in the Ontario University Athletics conference of U Sports and, where applicable, in the west division.

Varsity teams
Wilfrid Laurier Golden Hawks teams compete in:
 Baseball (m) 
 Basketball (m/w) 
 Cheerleading (w)
 Cross Country Running (m/w)
 Curling (m/w) 
 Ice hockey (m/w) 
 Football (m) 
 Golf (m/w) 
 Lacrosse (m/w) 
 Rugby (m/w) 
 Soccer (m/w) 
 Swimming (m/w)

Gallery

Golden Hawks cheerleading
The WLU Competitive Cheerleading team has also risen to prominence in the last few years having won 6 national championship titles at the University National Cheerleading Championships conducted by Power Cheerleading Athletics. The Golden Hawk Cheerleaders have been ranked in the top five squads in the nation at least 8 times in the past 10 years, winning 6 national titles in 2007, 2008 (in the All-Female division), 2009 (in the Small-Coed division), 2010 (All-Female Division), and 2011 (All-Female Division). Most recently, the team brought home first place at the 2013 (All-Female Division) University Nationals Competition managing to outscore teams from all other divisions, securing the title of Grand Champions. In addition to the program's primarily competitive focus, the team can also be found cheering sidelines at football games, and both men's and women's basketball games.

Golden Hawks football

The Golden Hawks football program has been one of the best in the conference, winning Vanier Cup national championships in 1991 and 2005. The team has also won 12 provincial championships, including eight Yates Cup championships. The program has been led by head coach Michael Faulds since 2013.

Golden Hawks women's ice hockey

The Golden Hawks women's varsity hockey team has become very successful, winning their first OUA championship in their 1998–1999 season as well as winning in seven consecutive years (2004–2010). Overall, the program has featured 11 conference champions, with the most recent coming in 2014. The team won their first and only national championship in 2005. The team has been led by head coach Kelly Paton since the 2018–2019 season.

Golden Hawks volleyball
Future Olympian Sam Schachter competed in volleyball for the Golden Hawks, with whom he was Ontario University Athletics Rookie of the Year.

See also
 U Sports

References

External links

 Wilfrid Laurier University athletics

 
U Sports teams
Golden Hawks
Sport in Waterloo, Ontario